White Carpathians Protected Landscape Area is one of the 14 protected landscape areas in Slovakia. The Landscape Area protects the Slovak part of the White Carpathians, part of the Slovak-Moravian Carpathians, in West Slovakia. The area stretches from Skalica District in the south west to the Púchov District in the north east, copying the  border between Slovakia and the Czech Republic and is about 80 km long.

White Carpathians PLA was founded on 12 July 1979, and the law was amended on 28 August 2003.

Biology and ecology

Forests cover 299.8 km2 (67.26%) of the area. The most widespread genera of trees are beech, linden and ash. Other plants include orchids, for example Dactylorhiza fuchsii subsp. sooiana and Ophrys holubyana. Private fields are often home to endangered species, such as corncockle (Agrostemma githago), corn buttercup (Ranunculus arvensis) and Nigella arvensis.

Animals are represented by the European mantis, Rosalia longicorn, Lucanus cervus, mountain Apollo, great crested newt, black stork, saker falcon, Eurasian eagle-owl, Eurasian lynx, and European wildcat.

See also
Protected areas of Slovakia

References
 BieleKarpaty.sk (official website)

External links
White Carpathians Protected Landscape Area at Slovakia.travel

Protected areas of Slovakia
Protected areas established in 1979
Protected areas of the Western Carpathians